Glengarry is a residential neighbourhood located in north east Edmonton, Alberta, Canada.  Northgate Centre, a major shopping mall, is located in the neighbourhood's north west corner.  North Town Mall is located immediately to the north of Glengarry in the neighbourhood of Northmount.

The neighbourhood is bounded on the north by 137 Avenue, on the south by 132 Avenue, on the east by 82 Street and on the west by 97 Street.

The community is represented by the Glengarry Community League, established in 1964, which maintains a community hall and outdoor rink located at 89 Street and 133 Avenue.

Demographics 

Residential development 
Residential development in Glengarry largely dates from after World War II and was substantially complete by 1985.  According to the 2001 federal census, approximately one in seven (15.2%) residences were built between 1946 and 1960.  Most of the development was during the 1960s, with seven out of every ten (70.8%) of all residences being constructed between 1961 and 1970.  The remaining one in eight (12.6%) of residences were built between 1971 and 1985.

The most common type of residence in the neighbourhood, account for just over half (55%) of all residences according to the 2005 municipal census, is the single-family dwelling.  Another one in five (21%) of all residences are row houses. Rented apartments in both low-rise and high-rise buildings account for another 17%.  Duplexes account for the remaining 7%.  Approximately three out of every four (73%) residences are owner-occupied while the remaining one out of every four (27%) are rented.

Population mobility 
The population of the neighbourhood is comparatively stable.  According to the 2005 municipal census, approximately two out of every three residents (63.9%) had lived at the same address for five years or more.

Schools 
There are four schools in Glengarry.  St. Cecilia Junior High School and Archbishop Oleary High School are both operated by the Edmonton Catholic School System.  Glengarry Elementary School is operated by the Edmonton Public School System.  The Fresh Start Outreach High School is also located in the neighbourhood.

Queen Elizabeth High School is located just south of Glengarry in the adjoining neighbourhood of Killarney.

Surrounding neighbourhoods

See also 
 Edmonton Federation of Community Leagues

References

External links 
 Glengarry Neighbourhood Profile

Neighbourhoods in Edmonton